The National Council for School Sport is an organisation based in Leicestershire that represents the participation in the UK in school sport, namely competitive sport.

History
It has been based in Nottinghamshire, but is now at Loughborough. Sport, in general, at many schools in England is promoted through the School Sports Partnerships Programme.

Function
The organisation is sport-led, not education-led. It has many contacts at the highest level in UK sport.

Structure
It is the UK's representative on the International School Sport Federation (formed in 1971), a federation of national school sports organisations. The International University Sports Federation governs sport from the age of 17. NCSS joined the ISF in 1975.

People who work on the council of the NCSS have strong connections to the national federations of individual sports. The organisation is about individual sports, more than general sport at schools. It promotes competitive sport.

It is sited at the Youth Sport Trust, headquartered at Loughborough University.

See also
 Association for Physical Education
 Institute of Swimming, at Loughborough
 National Healthy Schools Programme
 UK Coaching Certificate

References

External links
 NCSS

International School Sport Federation
Organisations based in Leicestershire
Organisations based in Nottinghamshire
Rushcliffe
School sport in the United Kingdom
Sport in Loughborough